is a Japanese entertainer, idol, actress, and singer who is represented by the talent agency, Horipro.

Biography
Imori was born on October 26, 1968 in Shimonita, Kanra District, Gunma, Japan. She graduated from Horikoshi High School in Nakano, Tokyo, Japan. While still in high school, Imori was selected as a winner from among 120,000 contestants in the 9th Horipro Talent Scout Caravan competition in 1984.

Filmography

TV series

Films

References

External links
Official profile

Japanese television personalities
Japanese idols
Japanese actresses
Japanese women singers
1968 births
Living people
People from Gunma Prefecture
Horikoshi High School alumni